Ah Hong ( - 1952) was a Chinese market gardener who spent most of his life in Alice Springs, and was a well regarded figure in an era of considerable prejudice towards Chinese people in Australia.

Early life 

Hong was born in Canton, now Guangzhou, around 1857 and little is known of his early life. His descendants believe that he travelled to Australia some time in the 1870s.

Life in the Northern Territory 

When Hong first arrived in the Northern Territory, some time in the 1870s, he first worked in the Top End on the Pine Creek goldfields and then the North Australia Railway before moving to Central Australia as a cook for the crews building the Overland Telegraph. He later described witnessing many of the thousands of fellow Chinese immigrants dying in the harsh labor conditions of railway construction. Once in Central Australia, he first worked as a cook at Bond Springs Station and then, briefly, as a miner at Arltunga.

In 1892 Hong settled in Alice Springs, then known as Stuart, and established a market garden on Todd Street on what is now the site of Megafauna Central (see: Todd Mall). At his garden Hong grew a variety of vegetables and raised chickens. He sold his produce using a horse and cart, sometimes as far as Arltunga.

Hong met and married Ranjika, a Western Arrernte woman, and they ran the garden together with the help of Bulabaka, one of Ranjika's three sons from a previous relationship. Hong and Ranjika had three children together: Dempsey, Ada and Gloria. As children of a mixed marriage they were exposed to significant amount of racism. Education for his children was important to Hong and he sent his two eldest children, Dempsey and Ada, to school in Oodnadatta before the establishment of the first school in Alice Springs in 1914 where the children were taught, with other Aboriginal children, by Ida Standley at The Bungalow.

Following the death of Ranjika in 1918, Hong took his children to China to be cared for by his family there. After a year long journey, Hong spent a year there before returning alone to Alice Springs. Once in Alice Springs again, Hong established a market garden on a new site, on Gap Road, where he also established an eating house for single men who were welcome to 'roll out their swags' in the garden for the price of a meal and built a large stone oven to become one of the town's first bakers.

Hong died in 1952, at the age of 102.

Legacy 

Hong was highly respected in the community of Alice Springs. When he died, the Centralian Advocate described his passing as marking a milestone in local history:

Many of Hong's descendants live in and around the Northern Territory and Alice Springs.

Hong Street in Gillen (a suburb of Alice Springs) is named for him.

References 

People from Alice Springs
1850s births
1952 deaths
People from Guangzhou
Chinese emigrants to Australia